Smart mobility refers to many modes of transport.

Some smart mobility services include:
 public transport (with real-time timetabling and route optimization, seamless travel and digital ticketing)
 Carsharing
 Mobility as a service (MaaS)
 Mobility on Demand (MOD)
 autonomous transport systems
 smart mobility services in freight and logistics
 drones and low-altitude aerial mobility

Overview

Mobility-as-a-Service
Mobility-as-a-Service enables multimodal mobility by providing user-centric information and travel services (navigation, location, booking, payment, ...) hence allowing mobility as a seamless service across all transport modes.
Mobility on Demand also don't require ownership of private automobiles and gives convenient access to a range of travel modes while socialising the high initial costs of switching to electric-vehicle based mobility. Integrated mobility on demand services can contribute to modal shift to public transport and also addresses spatial inefficiencies of private transport.
The car also has a small role to play within smart mobility (it is particularly useful in a context which does not require personal ownership of the car, see above). Cars can be made to use intelligent transportation systems.

See also
 Smart city
 Shared mobility
 European Green Deal: Smart mobility is a component thereof
 Remote work

References

Transportation engineering
Shared transport